Global Health may refer to:

 Global Health (database), a bibliographic database which focuses on research literature
 Global health, the health of populations in the global context